Psychedelic Polyhedron is the second album by Mainliner, released in April 1997 by Fractal Records.

Track listing

Personnel 
Jérôme Genin – cover art
Kawabata Makoto – guitar
Asahito Nanjo – vocals, bass guitar, production
Tatsuya Yoshida – drums

References

External links 
 

1997 albums
Mainliner (band) albums